Heterocampa cubana, the Cuban heterocampa moth or sunflower moth, is a species of moth in the family Notodontidae (the prominents). It was first described by Augustus Radcliffe Grote in 1866 and it is found in Cuba and the US state of Florida.

The MONA or Hodges number for Heterocampa cubana is 7984.

References

Further reading

 
 
 

Notodontidae
Articles created by Qbugbot
Moths described in 1866